Moloko is an electronic/pop duo from Sheffield, England.

Moloko may also refer to:
 The Moloko language
 Moloko Plus, a fictional drink in the book A Clockwork Orange
 Moloko Temo, an African woman, a longevity claimant
 "Moloko" (song), a song by Ukrainian singer Loboda
 The Russian and Ukrainian word for milk